The Devil Makes Three is a 1952 American thriller film set in post-World War II Germany, starring Gene Kelly, Pier Angeli and Richard Egan.

Plot
Former Eighth Air Force bomber crewman Captain Jeff Eliot returns to Germany in 1947 to visit the family who rescued and hid him from the Nazis after his plane was shot down over Munich in World War II.

He learns that most of the family was killed by an American air raid. The only survivor is the daughter, Wilhelmina Lehrt, who is working as a hostess in a nightclub and hates Americans. Eliot nonetheless manages to romance "Willie" and in his time at the nightclub, he develops a friendship with Heisemann, a comic.

Heisemann, it turns out, has secret ties to an underground Nazi revivalist movement. When Eliot discovers this, he tells his superiors, who order him to continue his relationship with Willie to learn more about Heisemann's operation.

The climax of the picture takes place in Berchtesgaden, and the scenes of Heisemann being chased through the rubble were filmed inside the ruins of Hitler's house just before its final demolition by the German government. Heisemann in the scene's final frame stands facing his captors in the notorious huge picture window of the house.

Cast
 Gene Kelly as Captain Jeff Eliot
 Pier Angeli as Wilhelmina "Willie" Lehrt
 Richard Rober as Colonel James Terry
 Richard Egan as Captain Parker
 Claus Clausen as Heisemann
Margot Hielscher: Bar Singer
 Ruth Megary: Waitress

Reception
According to MGM records the film made $743,000 in the US and Canada and $742,000 elsewhere, resulting in a loss of $57,000.

References

External links

1952 films
American black-and-white films
Metro-Goldwyn-Mayer films
1950s romantic thriller films
Films set in 1947
Films set in Germany
Films set in Bavaria
Films set in Munich
American romantic thriller films
1950s English-language films
1950s American films